"Let's Go Surfing" is the debut single by American band, The Drums, released from their self-titled debut album. The single was first released in the UK on 15 September 2009 as the lead single from the band's EP Summertime!, but was later re-released on 9 August 2010. On both releases, the track was released as a double A-side with the Summertime! EP exclusive track "Don't Be A Jerk, Johnny", although only the lead track received chart placement in the UK. An excerpt of the song was used in advertising for Volkswagen.

In October 2011, NME placed it at number 60 on its list "150 Best Tracks of the Past 15 Years".

Track listing
Digital download

Chart performance
Upon initial release in September 2009, "Let's Go Surfing" debuted on the UK Singles Chart at number 107, narrowly missing out on the Top 100. However, after receiving airplay from BBC Radio 1 DJs such as Fearne Cotton, the single re-entered the Top 100 at number 87 on 14 August 2010; as a result of the reissue. The single then continued to rise, climbing 20 places to number 67 the following week and eventually reaching a peak position of number 63 on 28 August 2010, marking the band's most successful single to date.

Release history

References

2009 songs
2009 singles
2010 singles
Island Records singles